Caché Armbrister (born 26 September 1989) is a Bahamian sprinter of Jamaican descent who specializes in the 100 metres, 200 metres and 400 metres She grew up in Nassau, where she attended St. Augustine's College. She later competed for Auburn University along with Nivea Smith and Sheniqua Ferguson who were all coached by Henry Rolle. During the 2013 season she moved to Jamaica to be coached by Usain Bolt and Yohan Blake's coach Glen Mills.

Ambrister now does athletic training for all ages.

Personal bests

See also
List of Auburn University people

References

External links
 
 Auburn Profile

1989 births
Living people
Sportspeople from Nassau, Bahamas
Bahamian female sprinters
Auburn University alumni
Auburn Tigers women's track and field athletes
Athletes (track and field) at the 2014 Commonwealth Games
Commonwealth Games competitors for the Bahamas
Bahamian people of Jamaican descent